Mr David Viner is an English folk and blues musician from London, England, described by "Glorious Noise" online music magazine as "an accomplished guitarist, a roguish vocalist and a skillful lyricist".

In the early 2000s he was "adopted" by the Detroit garage scene, recording his eponymous debut album with members of the Soledad Brothers and Von Bondies.

Returning to London, he continued to record and release music, and toured extensively, including supporting the White Stripes on their last European tour, and opening for Dr John and Spiritualized.

Viner currently lives in Norfolk, where he grows organic heritage vegetables and keeps rare breed chickens.

Discography

Albums 
 Mr David Viner (Dim Mak records) 2003
 This Boy Don't Care (Loog) 2004
 Among The Rumours And The Rye (Loose) 2008
Better In Than Out (self-released) 2011
 So Well Hid (Light & Liberty/Mauvaise Foi) 2016

Singles and EPs 
 "Where The Posies Grow" - 7" vinyl, Loog records 2003
 "Long Gone Honey" / "Goblin In My Bread" - 7" vinyl, Loog 2004
 "Silence Is Gonna Break" - 7" vinyl, Fitzrovian Phonographic, 2006
 "Go Home" - Ambiguous Records, 2008
 "Pallet On Your Floor" - (with Deanne Iovan), 7" single, Mo Pop, 2008
 Beyond Belief EP - self-released CD and digital download, 2011

References 

Musicians from London
English folk singers
English folk guitarists
English blues singers
English blues guitarists
Year of birth missing (living people)
Living people